Khuyoi Tompok (154 AD-263 AD; 1551 MF-1661 MF) was a Meetei ruler of Ningthouja dynasty of Ancient Manipur (Antique Kangleipak). He is the only son and the successor of Emperor Nongda Lairen Pakhangba and Empress Laisana.

It was during his era that the time measuring device (pung/poong) and a traditional drum (a musical instrument) (pung/poong) were invented in the kingdom for the first time.

Various experiments were carried out for the perfection of the traditional drum. At first, deer skin was used, secondly, tiger skin and thirdly, cow skin was used in making the drum.

The Chinglon Laaihui accounts for his expedition to find out metal ores, especially gold and silver ores in the kingdom.

He is one of the nine kings associated with the design of a royal flag.

Other websites 

 Niṃthaurola śaireṃ
 Society, Politics, and Development in North East India
 Folk Culture of Manipur
 Manipur
 Folk-lore (India)
 Time Measuring Device

References 

History of Manipur
Kings of Ancient Manipur
Pages with unreviewed translations